Tobias Dahm (born 23 May 1987) is a German athlete specialising in the shot put. He represented his country at the 2016 World Indoor Championships finishing eighth.

His personal bests in the event are 20.38 metres outdoors (Kassel 2016) and 20.56 metres indoors (Sassnitz 2016).

Competition record

References

1987 births
Living people
German male shot putters
Place of birth missing (living people)
Athletes (track and field) at the 2016 Summer Olympics
Olympic athletes of Germany